The Rising Sun: The Decline and Fall of the Japanese Empire, 1936–1945 is a non-fiction history book by John Toland, published by Random House in 1970. It won the 1971 Pulitzer Prize for General Non-Fiction. It was republished by Random House in 2003.

A chronicle of the rise and fall of the Empire of Japan during World War II, from the invasion of Manchuria and China to the atomic bombings of Hiroshima and Nagasaki, told from the Japanese perspective, it is in the author's words, "a factual saga of people caught up in the flood of the most overwhelming war of mankind, told as it happened—muddled, ennobling, disgraceful, frustrating, full of paradox."

References

External links

1970 non-fiction books
2001 non-fiction books
Political books
Pulitzer Prize for General Non-Fiction-winning works
Books about Japan